Sri Sarada Secondary School is a school in Chennai, at Gopalapuram. It was formed in 1976 by the veteran educationalist Late Smt T. Vasanthalakshmi, supported by Kulapathi Dr. S. Balakrishna Joshi. During the 1976–77 school year, Sri Sarada Secondary School was launched in memory of her mother, Smt Sarada. The school was affiliated to the Central Board of Secondary Education, New Delhi.

The school

As the founder-President, the Principal and the Correspondent, Smt T. Vasanthalakshmi served the institution for over two decades, working towards the objective of preserving high moral values, tradition, culture and heritage, through the medium of education.

Even from the year 1952, she had been involved in teaching and had served in different capacities and led many institutions like Kesari High School, MCN High School and Adarsh Vidyalaya Matriculation School, all in Chennai. On health grounds, she retired as the Principal of Sri Sarada Secondary School in April 1996, but continued as the Correspondent and the Educational Consultant of the school. She died in December 2010.

Houses
Students are placed into four houses, each representing the rivers of India upon admission:

Ganga - Blue flag
Kaveri - Green flag
Yamuna - Yellow flag
Godavari - Red flag

The houses are identified by the colour of the flag. The houses are awarded points based on their performance in extra-curricular activities - especially sports.

References and info

Primary schools in Tamil Nadu
High schools and secondary schools in Chennai
Educational institutions established in 1976
1976 establishments in Tamil Nadu